The right to assemble is recognized as a human right and protected in the First Amendment of the US Constitution under the clause, "Congress shall make no law respecting an establishment of religion, or prohibiting the free exercise thereof; or abridging the freedom of speech, or of the press; or the right of the people peaceably to assemble, and to petition the Government for a redress of grievances."

Widespread mass protest became a distinct characteristic of 20th and 21st century American civic engagement, with each of the top ten attended protests occurring since 1970 and four of the top five occurring since the start of the Trump administration in 2017.

Methodology
In 1995, the National Park Service estimated 400,000 people attended the Million Man March in Washington, D.C., the official count for the event. The organizers said more than a million people turned out, and they threatened to sue the Park Service unless it revised its estimate. Congress, in response, barred the agency from producing any more crowd estimates.

Since then, official crowd estimates for organized political protests, demonstrations, and marches have relied on an amalgam of police data, organizer estimates, the research of crowd scientists, and journalists.

List
Rows shaded in yellow indicates the protest happened in multiple cities simultaneously across the United States.

See also 
 List of protests in the United States
 List of protests in the 21st century

References

 
Protests
Protests
Protest
Protest